In computer science, learning vector quantization (LVQ) is a prototype-based supervised classification algorithm. LVQ is the supervised counterpart of vector quantization systems.

Overview 
LVQ can be understood as a special case of an artificial neural network, more precisely, it applies a winner-take-all Hebbian learning-based approach. It is a precursor to self-organizing maps (SOM) and related to neural gas, and to the k-nearest neighbor algorithm (k-NN). LVQ was invented by Teuvo Kohonen.

An LVQ system is represented by prototypes  which are defined in the feature space of observed data. In winner-take-all training algorithms one determines, for each data point, the prototype which is closest to the input according to a given distance measure. The position of this so-called winner prototype is then adapted, i.e. the winner is moved closer if it correctly classifies the data point or moved away if it classifies the data point incorrectly.

An advantage of LVQ is that it creates prototypes that are easy to interpret for experts in the respective application domain.
LVQ systems can be applied to multi-class classification problems in a natural way. 

A key issue in LVQ is the choice of an appropriate measure of distance or similarity for training and classification. Recently, techniques have been developed which adapt a parameterized distance measure in the course of training the system, see e.g. (Schneider, Biehl, and Hammer, 2009) and references therein.

LVQ can be a source of great help in classifying text documents.

Algorithm
Below follows an informal description.
The algorithm consists of three basic steps. The algorithm's input is:
 how many neurons the system will have  (in the simplest case it is equal to the number of classes)
 what weight each neuron has  for 
 the corresponding label  to each neuron 
 how fast the neurons are learning 
 and an input list  containing all the vectors of which the labels are known already (training set).

The algorithm's flow is:
 For next input  (with label ) in  find the closest neuron , i.e.  , where  is the metric used ( Euclidean, etc. ).
 Update . A better explanation is get  closer to the input , if  and  belong to the same label and get them further apart if they don't.  if  (closer together)  or  if  (further apart).
 While there are vectors left in  go to step 1, else terminate.

References

Further reading 
 Self-Organizing Maps and Learning Vector Quantization for Feature Sequences, Somervuo and Kohonen. 2004 (pdf)

External links 
 lvq_pak official release (1996) by Kohonen and his team

Artificial neural networks
Classification algorithms